The  is a skyscraper located in Marunouchi, Tokyo, Japan. Construction of the 180-metre, 37-story skyscraper was finished in 2002.

Tenants 
 1st basement: retail stores, cafes, restaurants, printing & copying store and banks (ATMs)
 1st floor: retail stores, cafe and restaurants
 2nd and 3rd floors: retail stores
 4th floor: retail stores, hair salons, cafe, etc.
 5th and 6th floors: restaurants
 7th, 9th, and 10th floors: Nagoya University of Commerce and Business Graduate School of Management
 10th floor: F-REGI
 15th - 18th floors: Deloitte Tohmatsu Consulting
 19th - 22nd floors: Bloomberg
 23rd floor: Advantest
 24th floor: Visa International
 25th floor: NGK Insulators Tokyo Headquarters
 27th and 28th floor: Intelligence
 29th floor: IBIDEN Tokyo Branch
 33rd Floor: AlixPartners, Greenhill & Co.
 34th floor: Treasure Data
 35th and 36th floors: restaurants

External links

  

Office buildings completed in 2002
Buildings and structures in Chiyoda, Tokyo
Marunouchi
Skyscraper office buildings in Tokyo
2002 establishments in Japan
Mitsubishi Estate